Mascarenhas may refer to:

Mascarenhas (surname), people named Mascarenhas
Mascarenhas (footballer), Domingos António da Silva (1937–2015), Angolan footballer
Mascarenhas, a civil parish of Mirandela, Portugal
Mascarenhas Islands, or Mascarene Islands, an archipelago in the Indian Ocean

See also
 Mascarenhasia, a plant genus